Tom Carew was a Brigadier, possibly later promoted to Major General, in the Sierra Leonean army and Chief of Defence Staff of the Government of Sierra Leone from April 2000  to November 2003, at which point Sierra Leone President Ahmad Tejan Kabbah reassigned him to non-military duties.

External links
Tom Carew on the Contemporary Africa Database
Transcript of the speech in which Carew was re-assigned

Year of birth missing (living people)
Sierra Leonean military personnel
Living people
Sierra Leone Creole people
People from Freetown